Erminia Frezzolini (27 March 1818 – 5 November 1884) was an Italian operatic soprano. She excelled in the coloratura soprano repertoire, drawing particular acclaim in the bel canto operas of Gaetano Donizetti and Vincenzo Bellini. She was married to tenor Antonio Poggi from 1841 to 1846.

Life and career
Born in Orvieto, Frezzolini initially studied singing with her father, the famous bass Giuseppe Frezzolini. She then studied in Milan with Domenico Ronconi and in Florence with Andrea Nencini and N. Tachinardi. At the advice of Maria Malibran she pursued further studies with Manuel Patricio Rodríguez García.

In 1837 Frezzolini made her professional opera debut in the title role of Bellini's Beatrice di Tenda at the Teatro della Pergola in Florence. She quickly arose in major opera houses throughout Italy, often in the operas of Bellini and Donizetti. In 1838 she was heard at the opera houses in Siena and Ferrara. In 1839 she portrayed the title role in the house premiere of Saverio Mercadante's Elena da Feltre at the Teatro Comunale di Bologna.

She sang several more roles in Bologna in 1838–1839, including the title roles in Anna Bolena, Beatrice di Tenda, and Lucia di Lammermoor. She made her debut at La Scala in 1839 as Bianca in Mercadante's Le due illustri rivali. She also made her debuts that year at the opera houses in Pisa, Reggio Emilia, and Perugia. 
 
Frezzolini created the role of Giselda in the world premiere of Giuseppe Verdi's I Lombardi alla prima crociata on 11 February 1843 at La Scala in Milan. On 15 February 1845 she sang the title role in the world premiere of Verdi's Giovanna d'Arco at La Scala. She portrayed Camilla in the world premiere of Saverio Mercadante's Orazi e Curiazi at the Teatro di San Carlo in Naples on 10 November 1846. On the international stage she made appearances at the Mariinsky Theatre in St. Petersburg, the Royal Opera House in London, the Teatro Real in Madrid, the Theater am Kärntnertor in Vienna, the Théâtre-Italien in Paris, and throughout North America. She remained active on the stage up until 1874. She died in Paris in 1884, aged 66.

References

1818 births
1884 deaths
Italian operatic sopranos
People from Orvieto
Pupils of Manuel García (baritone)
19th-century Italian women opera singers